The Canadian Human Rights Commission (CHRC) was established in 1977 by the government of Canada. It is empowered under the Canadian Human Rights Act to investigate and to try to settle complaints of discrimination in employment and in the provision of services within federal jurisdiction. The CHRC is also empowered under the Employment Equity Act to ensure that federally-regulated employers provide equal opportunities for four designated groups: women, Aboriginal people, the disabled, and visible minorities. The Commission helps enforce those human rights and inform the general public and employers of those rights.

Organization and structure
The Canadian Human Rights Commission was established by Parliament in 1977 to administer the Canadian Human Rights Act. Its role was later expanded to include the Employment Equity Act.

Both laws apply to federally-regulated organizations, which include federal government departments and agencies; Crown corporations; and private sector organizations such as banks, airlines, and transportation and telecommunication companies.

Under the Canadian Human Rights Act, the Commission protects the human rights of all individuals lawfully present in Canada. It promotes a vision for Canada in which all individuals have equal opportunity and can live their lives free from discrimination.

The Commission is responsible for dealing with allegations of discrimination. By law, it is bound to screen every discrimination complaint that it receives. When possible, the Commission encourages people to try to solve their disputes informally.

If people are unable to solve the matter themselves, then the Commission may conduct an investigation. If it believes the complaint has merit, the Commission may send it to the Canadian Human Rights Tribunal for further examination. Otherwise, the complaint is dismissed.

In some instances, the Commission can also appear before the Tribunal. That occurs when the Commission feels that the complaint deals with a matter of public interest, which includes decisions that have the potential to clarify, influence, shape, or define human rights law in Canada.

Under the Employment Equity Act, the Commission promotes equality in the workplace for the four designated groups: women, Aboriginal peoples, persons with disabilities, and members of visible minorities. It works with employers to ensure that no person is denied employment opportunities or benefits for reasons unrelated to their abilities. To that end, the Commission conducts compliance audits to help employers meet the requirements of the Act.

See also
Section 13 of the Canadian Human Rights Act
Human Rights Commission
Human Rights in Canada

External links

Archive of News Articles Covering the CHRC
Canada’s Human Rights Commission System: Introduction to the Canadian Human Rights Commission and Tribunal

National human rights institutions
Federal departments and agencies of Canada
Human rights organizations based in Canada
1977 establishments in Canada